Mappilaiurani is a village in Thoothukudi district in the Indian state of Tamil Nadu.

Demographics
 India census, Mappilaiurani had a population of 26,802. Males constitute 50% of the population and females 50%. Mappilaiurani has an average literacy rate of 93%, higher than the national average of 59.5%: male literacy is 97%, and female literacy is 89%. In Mappilaiurani, 14% of the population is under 6 years of age.

References

Villages in Thoothukudi district